An Eye for Beauty is a 2014 Canadian drama film directed by Denys Arcand.

The film stars Éric Bruneau as Luc, an architect from Quebec married to Stéphanie (Mélanie Thierry), who begins an extramarital affair with Lindsay (Melanie Merkosky) while on a business trip to Toronto.  The film is distributed in the US by Monument Releasing.

References

External links
 

2014 films
2014 drama films
Adultery in films
Canadian drama films
English-language Canadian films
Films directed by Denys Arcand
Films set in Quebec
Films set in Toronto
Films shot in Quebec
Films shot in Toronto
French-language Canadian films
2010s English-language films
2010s Canadian films